OEG may refer to:

 Occluded eye gunsight, a type of optical sight
 Oilers Entertainment Group, owners of the NHL's Edmonton Oilers
 Olfactory ensheathing glia, a type of brain cell
 Oliver Ernest Goonetilleke, 3rd Governor-General of Ceylon
 Oberrheinische Eisenbahn, or Upper Rhine Railway Company